A pecan is a type of nut belonging to either of two species: 
 Carya illinoinensis, the usual meaning of pecan
 Carya aquatica, bitter pecan, also called water hickory

The pecans are the four species of section Apocarya in the genus Carya, two of which are individually known as hickories

Pecan may also refer to:

Places
In the United States
 Pecan, Georgia
 Pecan City, Georgia
 Pecan Acres, Texas
 Pecan Bayou (disambiguation)
 Pecan Gap, Texas
 Pecan Grove (disambiguation)
 Pecan Hill, Texas
 Pecan Park, Houston, a neighbourhood of Houston, Texas
 Pecan Plantation, Texas
 Pecan Valley, Texas

Foods
Pecan pie
Pecan sandie

Sports
 Pecan Bowl, a defunct college football game